HAMT may stand for:

 The ICAO code for Mizan Teferi Airport
 Hash array mapped trie, a functional data-structure
 Hodkinson abbreviated mental test score for dementia
 Human-aided machine translation